You People Are All the Same is a 2012 stand-up comedy film directed by Jay Karas and written by and starring the American comedian Bill Burr. It is his first stand-up comedy special exclusively for Netflix, and Netflix's first venture into comedy specials, not becoming a trend until at least a year later. In You People Are All the Same, filmed at Washington, D.C.’s Lincoln Theater, Bill Burr talks about race, gun politics, the politics of domestic relationships and more.

Cast
 Bill Burr

Release
It was released on August 16, 2012 on Netflix.

References

External links
 
 
 

2012 television specials
Netflix specials
Stand-up comedy concert films
2012 comedy films
2010s English-language films
Films directed by Jay Karas